The Open Air School is a historic building in the Tuttle Park area of Old North Columbus in Columbus, Ohio. The building was constructed as a school, and today houses local a café, bar, a fitness center, and event space. It was listed on the National Register of Historic Places in 2019.

The former open air school building first housed students at risk of catching tuberculosis. Because of this, the building has large windows, gathering spaces, outdoor areas, and nearby wilderness. It replaced an older open air school building on the site, built in 1913. The 1927 building subsequently held Neil Avenue Elementary, from 1956 to 1975. It then held Columbus City Schools administrative offices, and subsequently sat vacant for years. Around 2019, a $6.1-million renovation plan was announced, for the site to hold a mix of businesses. Proposed tenants included a coffee shop, fitness center, a restaurant, and offices. In 2022, a local brewery opened a restaurant and bar, called Understory, on-site.

It was designed by Howard Dwight Smith, architect of the Ohio Stadium, and was built in 1927. Its Italian Renaissance Revival style is constructed of reinforced concrete and has a brick and terra cotta facade.

See also
 National Register of Historic Places listings in Columbus, Ohio
 Schools in Columbus, Ohio

References

External links
 

National Register of Historic Places in Columbus, Ohio
Schools in Columbus, Ohio
1927 establishments in Ohio
Defunct schools in Ohio
School buildings completed in 1927
Italian Renaissance Revival architecture in the United States
Old North Columbus